Ben Nevis, near Fort William in Scotland, is the highest mountain in the British Isles, standing at 1,345 m or 4,413 ft above sea level.

Ben Nevis may also refer to:
 Ben Nevis distillery, a distillery in Scotland that produces Ben Nevis whisky
 Ben Nevis Race a mountain running race up and down the mountain
 Ben Nevis Ultra, an extreme mountain running event in Scotland
 Ben Nevis (horse), a racehorse that won the Grand National
 Ben Nevis railway station, an abandoned railway station in Victoria, Australia
 Ben Nevis (Svalbard), a mountain in Spitsbergen
 Ben Nevis Township, a township in Ontario, Canada
 Wee Ben Nevis, a comic strip published in The Beano

See also
 Nevis Radio, a community radio station in Fort William, Scotland
 Nevis range, a ski area near Fort William
 Nevisport, an outdoor clothing firm founded in Fort William
 Nevis (disambiguation), other uses of "Nevis"